The Yugoslavia men's national under 20 ice hockey team was the national under-20 ice hockey team in the  Socialist Federal Republic of Yugoslavia. The team represented Yugoslavia at the International Ice Hockey Federation's IIHF World U20 Championship.

References

Junior national ice hockey teams
Ice hockey in Yugoslavia
Former national ice hockey teams